HMS Shearwater was a  sloop launched in 1900. She served on the Pacific Station and in 1915 was transferred to the Royal Canadian Navy as HMCS Shearwater, serving as a submarine depot ship until 1919. She was sold to the Western Shipping Company in May 1922 and renamed Vedas.

Construction and design
Shearwater was laid down at Sheerness Dockyard on 1 February 1899, and floated out of dock when she was launched on 10 February 1900 by Lady Bowden-Smith, wife of Sir Nathaniel Bowden-Smith, Commander-in-Chief, The Nore. The ship displaced 980 tons and had a complement of 130.

The Condor class was constructed of steel to a design by William White, the Royal Navy Director of Naval Construction. The bridge was located on the poop deck and the ships were designed with a clipper bow and a slightly raked funnel. Shearwater was powered by a Thames Iron Works three-cylinder vertical triple-expansion steam engine developing  from four Belleville boilers and driving twin screws.

Sail plan
The class was originally designed and built with barque-rigged sails, although some pictures show ships of the class with a barquentine rig.  was lost in a gale during her first commission, and the contemporary gunnery pioneer Admiral Percy Scott ascribes her sinking to the encumbrance of sails, and furthermore believed that her loss finally convinced that Admiralty to abandon sails entirely. All other ships of the class had their sails removed during the first few years of the twentieth century.

Armament and armour
The class was armed with six 4-inch/25 pdr (1 ton) quick-firing breech loaders and four 3-pounder quick-firing breech loaders. The guns were arranged with two on the forecastle, two amidships and two aft. In 1914, two of her 4-inch guns were landed and used to defend Seymour Narrows in British Columbia after the First World War broke out.

The guns were equipped with gun shields which had  armour.

Service history

Royal Navy
Shearwater was commissioned at Chatham 24 October 1901 by Commander Charles Henry Umfreville, with a complement of 104 officers and men. She left the Nore in early November to relieve  on the Royal Navy's Pacific Station. In July 1902 she toured the Bering Sea, and in November that year she visited Honolulu, followed by a visit to Fanning Island in December.

The station itself was suspended in 1905, and the facilities at Esquimalt, British Columbia passed to the Canadian Department of Marine and Fisheries. Shearwater and  remained at Esquimalt, and in 1910 the Naval Service Bill was passed, creating the Royal Canadian Navy. Shearwater recommissioned, still as a Royal Navy vessel, at Esquimalt on 27 November 1912. At the onset of the First World War, Algerine and Shearwater were deployed as part of an international squadron off the coast of Mexico, protecting foreign interests during their civil war.

Royal Canadian Navy service

After arriving at Esquimalt, two of Shearwaters 4-inch guns were taken ashore and used with a shore battery position to defend the Seymour Narrows, while the crew of Shearwater was sent to Halifax, Nova Scotia to man HMCS Niobe, which was short of trained sailors.

After discussions between the Royal Canadian Navy and the Admiralty Shearwater recommissioned on 8 September 1914 as a submarine tender for the Canadian s at Esquimalt. She was transferred permanently in 1915 to the Royal Canadian Navy, becoming HMCS Shearwater.

In 1917 Shearwater escorted the two submarines to Halifax, transiting through the Panama Canal. For the remainder of the war, she saw very limited duty as a Royal Canadian Navy support vessel on the Atlantic coast, mostly spent training with the CC-class submarines in Baddeck Bay.

Shearwater was paid off from the Royal Canadian Navy on 13 June 1919. She was sold to the Western Shipping Company in May 1922 and renamed Vedas. Her register was closed in 1937 and she was broken up at Windsor, Ontario.

References

Notes

Citations

Sources

External links

 Canadian Navy Heritage Project: Photo Archive

 

Sloops of the Royal Canadian Navy
Condor-class sloops
Victorian-era sloops of the United Kingdom
1900 ships
Ships built in Sheerness
Auxiliary ships of the Royal Canadian Navy